Charles F. Lembke (March 4, 1865 – July 18, 1923) was an American architect and contractor who was prominent in Valparaiso, Indiana.  Lembke built many downtown Valparaiso-area buildings, such as the Memorial Opera House (National Register, 1984), Carnegie public Library, Hotel Lembke, and several local schools.

Lembke was born to German immigrants Christian Lembke and Caroline Nuppnau Lembke. He completed his education in his hometown of Valparaiso, then went on to Valparaiso University, completing his education in the School of Architecture at the University of Chicago.  He returned to Valparaiso and formed the Charles Lembke company with his two brothers, William and Henry.  Because state law would not allow an architect to build the structure he designed, Charles managed the design business and Henry managed the construction business; they built much of what they designed. 
Charles grandson stated in 1966 that the family felt that Charles best work as DeMotte Hall on the campus of Valparaiso University.  Constructed in 1915 as the Agriculture and Domestic Science Building, the building served the university after 1959 as the Valparaiso School of Law.

Awards
At the Paris Exposition of 1900, the French Society of Architects awarded Charles Lembke First Place and the Gold medal for the best two-room school house made of brick. This was the Center Township District No. 3 School.

Projects
Charles Lembke contributed a significant number of structures to Valparaiso and Porter County.  He is credited with 28 residences, 18 schools, and 27 business. between 1900 and 1923.
 1871, Porter County Jail, S. Washington, builder
 1881, Telephone Building, architect 
 1890, Lembke House, 304 Morgan St., Valparaiso
 1890, Vidette Messenger Building, 163-167 W. Lincolnway, architect 
 1891, Christian Hospital, 108 E. Jefferson St., architect, razed ca 1978
 1893, Memorial Hall, 104 E. Indiana, architect
 1895, Center Township District No. 1 School, aka Flint Lake School, SR 49 at 500 N., architect, razed 2000 
 1896, Jackson Township District No. 5 School, 300 E, architect
 1898, Columbia School, 500 E. Indiana, architect, razed 1965
 1899, Gardner School, W. Jefferson St, builder
 ca. 1900; Center Township District No. 3 School, architect,
 1900. Science Building (Baldwin Hall), Valparaiso University, College Place; razed 1996 
 1900/12, J. Lowenstines and Sons, 57-63 N Franklin, architect, burned ca. 1992
 1904, Valparaiso Central School, 305 N. Franklin St., architect, burned 1938
 1905, Porter County Home, south S.R. 2 
 1905, Steve L. Finney House/Joseph Urschel House, 202 N. Michigan, architect
 1906, Dr. David J. Loring Residence and Clinic, 102 N. Washington St, architect
 1906-07, Biology and Medical Building, Valparaiso University, College Place, architect, razed ca 1995
 1907, Lembke Hall, Valparaiso University, S. College St. (demolished 1996) 
 1909, Altruria Hall, Valparaiso University, College at Brown St, razed 1985
 ca 1910; Music Hall (Kinsey Hall), Valparaiso University, College St., architect, burned 1970
 1912-13, Charles Thune House, 357 W. Jefferson St, builder 
 1914, Valparaiso Carnegie Library, 107 E. Jefferson St., builder. demolished 1995
 1915, ca; Agriculture and Domestic Science Building, Valparaiso University, College at Freeman, architect; In 1959, it was renamed DeMotte Hall 
 1923, Hotel Lembke, 23 N. Lafayette St. at Jefferson, builder, razed 1988 
 Auto Dealership, 212-216 E. Lincolnway, architect, first poured concrete structure in Valparaiso.
 Memorial Theater, W. Lincolnway, architect,
 Premier Theater, N. Franklin, architect 
 Specht-Finney Building, Main (Lincolnway) at Franklin, architect
 Bogarte Building, Bookstore, at Valparaiso University.

Other Activities
Charles Lambke was awarded three patents on internal combustion engines.

References

External links

19th-century American architects
1923 deaths
1865 births
Valparaiso University alumni
People from Valparaiso, Indiana
American people of German descent